American singer Miley Cyrus has recorded songs for eight studio albums, five soundtrack albums, two EPs and other album or singles appearances. Part of her songs are credited to the fictional characters she has played: Hannah Montana and Ashley O. She recorded 120 songs for her own albums. But she also recorded 46 songs for Hannah Montana and other 57 songs outside her albums, totaling 223 songs. Among the 223 songs, 38 of them are covers.

She first came to prominence within the entertainment industry for her portrayal of Hannah Montana in the television series of the same name, which premiered in March 2006. Cyrus is credited as Hannah Montana for eight of the thirteen tracks featured on its first soundtrack album Hannah Montana, which was released in October 2006. Matthew Gerrard was responsible for much of its songwriting and production, and tended towards a "sugary - sweet" sound. In 2006, Cyrus additionally signed a recording contract with Hollywood Records. The following year, Walt Disney Records and Hollywood Records jointly released the double album Hannah Montana 2: Meet Miley Cyrus; the first disc served as the soundtrack album for the second season of Hannah Montana, while the second disc served as Cyrus' debut studio album. Cyrus' music incorporated prominent elements of pop and pop rock musical styles; she shared writing credits with Antonina Armato and Tim James, who collectively form the production team Rock Mafia, on the tracks "See You Again", "Let's Dance", "Right Here", and "Good and Broken". "See You Again" was serviced as the lead single from the record, and became Cyrus' first top-ten entry on the U.S. Billboard Hot 100.

Cyrus' second studio album Breakout (2008) was her first record released separately from the Hannah Montana franchise. She again collaborated with Armato and James during its production; together, they co-wrote "7 Things", "Fly on the Wall", "Bottom of the Ocean", "Wake Up America", and "Goodbye". In 2009, Cyrus recorded and released the soundtrack albums Hannah Montana: The Movie and Hannah Montana 3, which were credited to Montana. The lead single from the former record, "The Climb", was written by Jessi Alexander and Jon Mabe. "Party in the U.S.A." was written by Jessie J, Dr. Luke, and Claude Kelly for her first extended play The Time of Our Lives (2009); its songwriting was largely handled by Dr. Luke, Kelly, and John Shanks. Cyrus released her third studio album Can't Be Tamed in June 2010; Cyrus co-wrote much of its material with Armato, James, and Shanks, including the lead single "Can't Be Tamed"; the song peaked at number eight on the Billboard Hot 100. The record was followed by the soundtrack Hannah Montana Forever in October 2010.

In 2013, Cyrus left Hollywood Records and subsequently joined RCA Records; her fourth studio album Bangerz was released through the label that October. Cyrus expressed intentions of incorporating elements of "dirty south hip-hop" into the record. Consequently, she co-wrote several of its tracks with hip hop producer Mike Will Made It, who handled most of its production; Pharrell Williams also co-wrote four songs for the album. The lead single "We Can't Stop" reached number two on the Billboard Hot 100, while its second single "Wrecking Ball" became Cyrus' first track to peak at number one in the United States. In August 2015 she released her fifth studio album, Miley Cyrus & Her Dead Petz, was available for free streaming on SoundCloud. In September 2017 she released her sixth studio album, Younger Now. In 2019 she released her second major extended play, She Is Coming, and two songs recorded as Ashley O for the television series Black Mirror. In November 2020 she released her seventh studio album, Plastic Hearts. In March 2021 she left RCA Records and subsequently joined Columbia Records. Her eight studio album, Endless Summer Vacation, is scheduled to be released in March 2023.

Songs

Songs released as Hannah Montana

Album appearances

Notes

References

Cyrus, Miley